Benjamin Stanley Rosenthal (June 8, 1923 – January 4, 1983) was an American Democratic Party politician from New York who represented the northern portion of Queens during twelve Congressional terms, from 1962 until his death. Upon his death at age 59, he was the third-most senior Representative in the New York delegation.

Biography
Born in New York City, Rosenthal attended public schools (including Stuyvesant High School), Long Island University and the City College of New York. He served in the United States Army from 1943 to 1946. Thereafter, he received his LL.B. from Brooklyn Law School in 1949 and an LL.M. from New York University in 1952. He was admitted to the New York bar in 1949 and commenced practice in New York City.

Rosenthal was elected as a Democrat to the Eighty-seventh United States Congress, filling the vacancy caused by the resignation of Representative Lester Holtzman. Taking office on February 20, 1962, he was re-elected that fall, and then again to ten succeeding Congresses.

Rosenthal was elected as a "regular" or machine Democrat, but compiled a liberal record, opposing the Vietnam War early on and working on consumer protection issues.

On May 17, 1962, Rosenthal read a statement into the Congressional Record praising the magazine Mad on its tenth anniversary. (Rosenthal's district, NY-8, included the part of Manhattan where Mad's offices were.) "Mad Magazine...for the last 10 years has humorously pointed out the laughable foibles of business, labor, advertising, television, sports and entertainment – to say nothing of politics," Rosenthal said.

Death and legacy
Rosenthal was re-elected again in 1982, but died of cancer in Washington, D.C. on January 4, 1983, just one day after the 98th United States Congress met for the first time. On March 1, Gary Ackerman was elected to the seat and held it through 2013.

Rosenthal is buried in Beth David Cemetery in Elmont, New York.

The Benjamin S. Rosenthal Library at Queens College, City University of New York, is named in his honor. Rosenthal's papers are held by the library's Department of Special Collections and Archives.

See also

 List of Jewish members of the United States Congress
 List of United States Congress members who died in office (1950–99)

References

External links
 Guide to the Benjamin S. Rosenthal papers, at Queens College, City University of New York, including links to selected digitized items
 

1923 births
1983 deaths
City College of New York alumni
Long Island University alumni
Stuyvesant High School alumni
Brooklyn Law School alumni
New York University School of Law alumni
Jewish members of the United States House of Representatives
Jewish American military personnel
Democratic Party members of the United States House of Representatives from New York (state)
Deaths from cancer in Washington, D.C.
United States Army soldiers
20th-century American politicians
Burials at Beth David Cemetery
20th-century American Jews